is a Japanese actress, voice actress, singer and sound director. She played Kazuha Toyama in Detective Conan, Casca in Berserk and Asuka Langley Soryu in Neon Genesis Evangelion.

Personal life
Miyamura was born in Kobe, and graduated from the theater division for Toho Gakuen College of Drama and Music. She was diagnosed with Graves' disease and exophthalmos in May 2007. She was initially married to manga artist, Nakatani D. from 1998 to 1999. Miyamura married stuntman Takayuki Seki in 2004. They had two children together, a daughter born in 2004 and a son born in 2011, before they divorced in 2016. The family lived in Melbourne, Australia, until she returned to Japan.

Career
Miyamura released various CD albums as a singer, which feature collaborations with well-known Japanese musicians, such as P-Model vocalist/Berserk series composer Susumu Hirasawa, Yapoos vocalist Jun Togawa and Pizzicato Five vocalist Yasuharu Konishi. Additionally, she also had a short on-screen role in the movie Battle Royale as the video announcer of the event's rules. She is affiliated with Techno Sound as a sound director and Japan Action Enterprises.

Filmography

Television animation

Original video animation (OVA)

Anime films

Video games

Dubbing

Live-action

Television programs

Pa-Pa-Pa-Pa-Puffy (narration)
Kyuukyuu Sentai GoGoFive (Kyoko Hayase, Infant Demon Drop)
Ninpuu Sentai Hurricanger Shushutto the Movie (Knuckle)
Samurai Sentai Shinkenger (Guest)

Discography

Solo

In Seyuu Groups

Furil'

1995: Yumemiru Ai Tenshi / FURIL [KIDA-106]
1995: Wedding Peach MUSIC BOUQUET 1 [KICA-256]
1995: Wedding Peach MUSIC BOUQUET 2 [KICA-269]
1995: Wedding Peach FURIL [KICA-249]
1995: Wedding Peach Dream Collection [JSCA-29034]

References

External links
 
 

1972 births
Living people
Japanese video game actresses
Japanese voice actresses
Voice actresses from Kobe

20th-century Japanese actresses
21st-century Japanese actresses